Thomas Street railway station is located on the Main line in Queensland, Australia. It serves the Ipswich suburb of Sadliers Crossing.

The station was approved was 1913, and opened for traffic on 20 April 1914.

Services
Thomas Street is served by City network services from Rosewood to Ipswich. Most services terminate at Ipswich although some peak-hour services continue to Bowen Hills and Caboolture.

Services by platform

References

External links

Thomas Street station Queensland Rail
Thomas Street station Queensland's Railways on the Internet
[ Thomas Street station] TransLink travel information

Railway stations in Australia opened in 1914
Sadliers Crossing, Queensland
Railway stations in Ipswich City
Main Line railway, Queensland